Nesopupa subcentralis is a species of very small, air-breathing land snail, a terrestrial pulmonate gastropod mollusk in the family Vertiginidae, the whorl snails. This species is endemic to Hawaii, in the United States.

References

Vertiginidae
Gastropods described in 1920
Molluscs of Hawaii
Taxonomy articles created by Polbot